Pierre Henri Puiseux (20 July 1855 – 28 September 1928) was a French astronomer.

Born in Paris, son of Victor Puiseux, he was educated at the École Normale Supérieure before starting work as an astronomer at the Paris Observatory in 1885.

He worked on the aberration of light, asteroids, lunar dynamics and, in collaboration with Maurice Loewy, the ill-fated Carte du Ciel project. Puiseux created a photographic atlas of the Moon based on 6000 photographs taken by him and Loewy.  In 1892 he was awarded the Valz Prize, and in 1896 was he awarded the Lalande Prize, both from the French Academy of Sciences, which he would later become a member of in 1912.

In 1900, Puiseux received the Prix Jules Janssen, the highest award of the Société astronomique de France (the French astronomical society). He became the Society's president from 1911-1913.

The crater Puiseux on the Moon is named after him.

He was a believing and practicing Catholic who died with the sacraments of the Church.

References

External links
 
 
 P. Puiseux @ Astrophysics Data System
 Atlas photographique de la Lune, on the digital library of Paris Observatory

Obituaries
 JRASC 22 (1928) 394 (one sentence)
 MNRAS 89 (1929) 327
 PASP 40 (1928) 413 (one paragraph)

1855 births
1928 deaths
19th-century French astronomers
École Normale Supérieure alumni
Members of the French Academy of Sciences
Recipients of the Lalande Prize
20th-century French astronomers